Our School's E.T. is a 2008 South Korean comedy-drama film directed by Park Kwang-chun (also known as K.C. Park). It stars Kim Su-ro as an unconventional, "alien-like" high school P.E. teacher whose position is put at stake when the school adopts a new policy to boost English education, so he decides that becoming an English teacher (E.T.) overnight is his only hope.

Synopsis
Chun Sung-geun (Kim Su-ro) is the gym teacher of a private high school in an upscale district where competition is heated among students to enter top colleges. Called "E.T." by his students because of his quirky appearance and behavior, he is a teacher who has lived life his own lazy, ignorant way for years without any worries. But one day he's hit with a crisis: At the school's board meeting, a parent requests that the school get rid of "useless" gym classes and expand the hours for English classes. The school decides to hire another English teacher— at the cost of a gym teacher. In danger of losing his position, he remembers by chance that he obtained a license to teach English a decade ago. The school board president tells him to pass a test in order for her to acknowledge it. So Sung-geun, who hasn't spoken (much less taught) English for ten years, faces the near-impossible task of becoming an English teacher within two weeks. His only weapon is his amazingly incomparable physical strength, and with the help of a few students who understand his warm heart, the simpleton Sung-geun begins his rigorous training to exercise his brain "muscles" to master English in his journey to become the school's E.T.

Cast

 Kim Su-ro as Chun Sung-geun
 Lee Han-wi as Principal Joo Ho-shik
 Baek Sung-hyun as Baek Jung-goo 
 Park Bo-young as Han Song-yi
 Lee Min-ho as Oh Sang-hoon  
 Moon Chae-won as Lee Eun-shil
 Lee Chan-ho as Ok Ki-ho
 Kim Sung-ryung as school board director Lee
 Kim Hyeong-beom as Cha Seung-ryong, English teacher
 Kim Ki-bang as "Meok-tong" (meaning hard-headed)
 Park Jin-taek as Jin-gook
 Kim Young-ok as Sung-geun's mother
 Kim Byeong-ok as president of publishing company 
 Ha Jung-woo as handsome doctor (cameo)
 Jang Hee-soo as Ki-ho's mother 
 Lee Young-yi as Eun-shil's mother
 Lee Hyung-kwon as Vice principal
 Gong Ho-seok as Teacher Choi
 Lee Chan-young as Byeong-jin
 Oh Yeon-seo as Soo-jin
 Maeng Bong-hak as Vice principal of countryside school
 Choi Yoon-jung as Yoon-jung
 Jeon In-geol as Kyeong-sam
 Kim Dong-beom as Je-dong
 Min Ji-hyun as Ki-ho's seat partner
 Kim Jae-rok as math teacher
 Jung Jong-yeol as music teacher
 Lee Sa-bi as chemistry teacher
 Yoo Jeong-ho as English Kim
 Kim Si-hyang as Sang-hoon's girlfriend
 Oh Soon-tae as Jo Ba-nom

References

External links
  
 
 
 

2000s teen comedy-drama films
2008 films
South Korean teen comedy-drama films
2000s Korean-language films
2000s South Korean films